Pat O'Leary is a former professional rugby league footballer who played in the 1940s and 1950s. He played at club level for Hull FC.

References

External links
Search for "O'Leary" at rugbyleagueproject.org
Search for "OLeary" at rugbyleagueproject.org
 (archived by web.archive.org) Stats → PastPlayers → O at hullfc.com
 (archived by web.archive.org) Statistics at hullfc.com
Search for "Pat O'Leary" at britishnewspaperarchive.co.uk

Living people
English rugby league players
Hull F.C. players
Hull Kingston Rovers players
Place of birth missing (living people)
Year of birth missing (living people)